Las2orillas is a Colombian news website founded in 2013; its director is María Elvira Bonilla. The website has a section called "Nota Ciudadana", which consists entirely on user-generated content.

In March 2015, the Colombian newspaper La República reported that Las2Orillas had 3.2 million unique users per month.

References 

2013 establishments in Colombia
Colombian news websites
Mass media companies established in 2013